Wang Xiaoyan (born November 13, 1970 in Zhengzhou, Henan) is a female Chinese softball player who competed at the 2004 Summer Olympics in Athens, Greece.

In the 2004 Olympic softball competition she finished fourth with the Chinese team. She played all eight matches as an infielder.

References

1970 births
Living people
Olympic softball players of China
People from Zhengzhou
Softball players at the 2004 Summer Olympics
Sportspeople from Henan
Asian Games medalists in softball
Softball players at the 1990 Asian Games
Softball players at the 1998 Asian Games
Softball players at the 2002 Asian Games
Medalists at the 1990 Asian Games
Medalists at the 1998 Asian Games
Medalists at the 2002 Asian Games
Asian Games gold medalists for China
Asian Games silver medalists for China